"Don't Go Breaking My Heart" is a 1995 song recorded by Swedish band Sonic Dream Collective, released as the second single from their debut album, Gravity (1995). A big club hit, it reached number five on the US Billboard Hot Dance Breakouts Club Play Top 5 list in 1997. It is sung by lead vocalist Linn Engström, who also co-wrote the lyrics with Gibril Jobe. A music video was also produced to promote the single, featuring the band performing in a club.

Critical reception
Larry Flick from Billboard wrote that the song "chugs with a synth-happy, reggae-spiced beat and a bit of throat-ravaging toasting by Gibril "Mr. Gee" Jobe." He added that "the focal point of the track, however, is singer Linn Engstrom, who has a reedy voice and an icy-cool delivery."

Polish version 
Shortly after the release of the song "Don't Go Breaking My Heart", the Polish version of the song "Nie jestem zła" was created, performed by Magdalena Sokołowska, who used her name as a stage pseudonym in the 1990s. This singer created songs on the borderline of eurodance and Polish dance music known as disco polo.

Track listing
 12" single, Sweden
"Don't Go Breaking My Heart" (Birch & Chris House Mix) – 5:31
"Don't Go Breaking My Heart" (JJ's Club Mix) – 17:38
"Don't Go Breaking My Heart" (JJ's Club Mix) – 27:58

 CD single, Sweden
"Don't Go Breaking My Heart" (Radio Version) – 3:53
"Take Me Back" (Radio Version) – 4:00

 CD maxi, Sweden
"Don't Go Breaking My Heart" (Radio Version) – 3:53
"Don't Go Breaking My Heart" (Club Mix) – 5:39
"Don't Go Breaking My Heart" (Birch & Chris Swing Mix) – 4:58
"Don't Go Breaking My Heart" (Solid Base Jungle Mix) – 4:23

References

 

1995 singles
1995 songs
Sonic Dream Collective songs
Epic Records singles
English-language Swedish songs